Wuthering Heights is an 1847 novel by Emily Brontë.

Wuthering Heights may also refer to:

Film and television
 Wuthering Heights (1920 film), a silent film directed by A. V. Bramble and scripted by Eliot Stannard
 Wuthering Heights (1939 film), a film starring Laurence Olivier and Merle Oberon
 Wuthering Heights (1948 TV play), a BBC adaptation starring Kieron Moore and Katharine Blake
 Wuthering Heights (1953 TV play), a BBC adaptation starring Yvonne Mitchell and Richard Todd
 Wuthering Heights (1954 film) by Luis Buñuel, also known by the titles Abismos de pasión and Cumbres Borrascosas
 Wuthering Heights, a 1957 DuPont Show of the Month production starring Richard Burton as Heathcliff
 Wuthering Heights (1959 film), an Australian television play
 Wuthering Heights (1967 TV series), a British television series starring Ian McShane and Angela Scoular 
 Wuthering Heights (1970 film), a film starring Timothy Dalton and Anna Calder-Marshall
 Wuthering Heights (1978 television serial), a film starring Ken Hutchison, Kay Adshead, Pat Heywood, John Duttine
 Wuthering Heights (1985 film), a 1985 French film
 Wuthering Heights (1988 film), a 1988 Japanese film
 Emily Brontë's Wuthering Heights, a 1992 film starring Juliette Binoche and Ralph Fiennes
 Wuthering Heights (1998 film), a 1998 television film starring Robert Cavanah, Orla Brady, Crispin Bonham-Carter and Matthew Macfadyen
 Wuthering Heights (2003 film), a television film starring Mike Vogel and Erika Christensen
 Wuthering Heights (2009 television serial), an ITV television film starring Tom Hardy and Charlotte Riley
 Wuthering Heights (2011 film), a 2011 film starring Kaya Scodelario and James Howson

Music
 Wuthering Heights (band), a Danish heavy metal band
 Wuthering Heights (Herrmann), a 1951 opera by Bernard Herrmann
 Wuthering Heights (Floyd), a 1958 opera by Carlisle Floyd
 Wuthering Heights (musical), a 1992 musical/operatic version by Bernard J. Taylor
 "Wuthering Heights" (song), by Kate Bush
 "Wuthering Heights", a song by Ali Project

Other
 Wuthering Heights (fictional location), the setting of the Brontë novel
 "Wuthering Heights", a poem by Sylvia Plath
 "Wuthering Heights", a poem by Ted Hughes, in response to Plath's poem
 "Wuthering Heights", a name for Presqu'île Ronarc'h, a peninsula in the Kerguelen Islands

See also
 Cumbres Borrascosas (disambiguation)
List of Wuthering Heights adaptations
List of Wuthering Heights references